German submarine U-215 was a Type VIID mine-laying U-boat of Nazi Germany's Kriegsmarine during World War II. She was one of six U-boats of her kind, equipped with special vertical tubes that launched the mines. Her keel was laid down 15 November 1940 by Germaniawerft in Kiel as yard number 647. The U-boat was launched on 9 October 1941 and commissioned on 22 November with Kapitänleutnant Fritz Hoeckner in command.

Design
As one of the six German Type VIID submarines, U-215 had a displacement of  when at the surface and  while submerged. She had two shafts and two  propellers.

U-215 was fitted with five  torpedo tubes (four fitted at the bow and one at the stern), twelve torpedoes, one  SK C/35 naval gun, 220 rounds, and an anti-aircraft gun, in addition to five mine tubes with fifteen SMA mines. The boat had a complement of 49.

Service history

U-215 was sunk in the summer of 1942 by British warship  while on a mission to lay mines in Boston Harbor after attacking and sinking the U.S. liberty ship Alexander Macomb, part of an allied convoy. The wreck was not discovered until 2004.

Wreck site
Four of her five vertical tubes are still sealed, her hatches are still sealed with the remains of 49 German sailors entombed within.

Summary of raiding history

References

Bibliography

External links

 CBC : First-ever U-boat found off Canadian coast
 USA Today Report : 'Sea Hunters' find deadly U-215

German Type VIID submarines
U-boats commissioned in 1941
U-boats sunk in 1942
World War II submarines of Germany
World War II shipwrecks in the Atlantic Ocean
1941 ships
Ships built in Kiel
U-boats sunk by depth charges
U-boats sunk by British warships
Ships lost with all hands
Maritime incidents in July 1942